The 1950 New Mexico Lobos football team represented the University of New Mexico in the Border Conference during the 1950 college football season.  In their first season under head coach Dudley DeGroot, the Lobos compiled a 2–8 record (2–5 against conference opponents), finished seventh in the conference, and were outscored by opponents by a total of 330 to 160. On defense, the team allowed an average of 33 points per game, ranking 116th of 120 major college teams.

Schedule

References

New Mexico
New Mexico Lobos football seasons
New Mexico Lobos football